Rizzi is a surname of Italian origin.

People with the name
Notable people with the surname include:

Sarkis Rizzi (1572-1638), Catholic Lebanese Maronite bishop
Bruno Rizzi (1901–1977), Italian political theorist; cofounder of the Communist Party of Italy
Camillo Rizzi (1580–1618), Italian painter of the Renaissance period
Carlo Rizzi (b, 1960), Italian conductor
Darren Rizzi (born 1970), Special Teams Coordinator for the New Orleans Saints of the National Football League
Federico Rizzi (b. 1981), Italian professional football player
Giuseppe Rizzi (1886-1996), Italian professional footballer
James Rizzi (1950-2011), American pop artist
Jorge Ángel Livraga Rizzi (1930–1991), Argentine poet, novelist, and philosopher
Luigi Rizzi (disambiguation), multiple people
Luigi Rizzi (footballer) (born 1907), Italian professional football player
Luigi Rizzi (linguist) (born 1952), Italian linguist
Mario Rizzi (1926-2010),  Roman Catholic Italian titular archbishop of Bagnoregio and apostolic nuncio to Bulgaria
Michael Rizzitello (1927–2005), Los Angeles mobster
Michele Rizzi (b. 1988), German professional footballer
Nicoletta Rizzi (1940-2010), Italian television, stage and film actress
Paolo Rizzi (born 1969), Italian retired footballer

Fictional characters
Carlo Rizzi (The Godfather), a fictional character in Mario Puzo's novel The Godfather
Constanzia 'Connie' Corleone-Rizzi, a fictional character in the novel and in the 1972 film The Godfather

See also
Rizzo (surname)
Italian-language surnames
Surnames of South Tyrolean origin